Mixifore, or Mogofin, is a minor Mande language of Guinea.

References

Mande languages
Languages of Guinea